Calathus colasianus is a species of ground beetle from the Platyninae subfamily that is endemic to Madeira.

References

colasianus
Beetles described in 1969
Endemic fauna of Madeira
Beetles of Europe